Hymenoepimecis is a genus of parasitoid wasps belonging to the family Ichneumonidae best known for parasitizing arachnids, specifically those of the families Araneidae and Tetragnathidae.

Distribution 
The species of this genus are found in the New World, from Mexico to southern Brazil.

Species 
Hymenoepimecis comprises the following twenty-seven species:

Hymenoepimecis amazonensis Pádua & Oliveira, 2015
Hymenoepimecis andina Pádua & Sääksjärvi, 2020
Hymenoepimecis argyraphaga Gauld, 2000
Hymenoepimecis atriceps (Cresson, 1865)
Hymenoepimecis bicolor (Brullé, 1846)
Hymenoepimecis cameroni Townes, 1966
Hymenoepimecis castilloi Pádua & Sääksjärvi, 2020
Hymenoepimecis dolichocarinata Pádua & Sääksjärvi, 2020
Hymenoepimecis duckensis Pádua & Onody, 2015
Hymenoepimecis ecuatoriana Pádua & Sääksjärvi, 2020
Hymenoepimecis heidyae Gauld, 1991
Hymenoepimecis heteropus (Kriechbaumer, 1890)
Hymenoepimecis japi Sobczak, Loffredo, Penteado-Dias & Gonzaga, 2009
Hymenoepimecis jordanensis Loffredo & Penteado-Dias, 2009
Hymenoepimecis kleini Pádua & Sobczak, 2015
Hymenoepimecis longilobus Pádua & Sääksjärvi, 2020
Hymenoepimecis manauara Pádua & Oliveira, 2015
Hymenoepimecis neotropica (Brues & Richardson, 1913)
Hymenoepimecis pucallpina Pádua & Sääksjärvi, 2020
Hymenoepimecis rafaelmartinezi Pádua & Sääksjärvi, 2020
Hymenoepimecis ribeiroi Pádua & Sobczak, 2015
Hymenoepimecis robertsae Gauld, 1991
Hymenoepimecis silvanae Loffredo & Penteado-Dias, 2009
Hymenoepimecis sooretama Sobczak, Loffredo, Penteado-Dias & Gonzaga, 2009
Hymenoepimecis tedfordi Gauld, 1991
Hymenoepimecis uberensis Pádua & Onody, 2015
Hymenoepimecis veranii Loffredo & Penteado-Dias, 2009

References

Ichneumonidae
Ichneumonidae genera
Pimplinae